Token may refer to:

Arts, entertainment, and media
 Token, a game piece or counter, used in some games
 The Tokens, a vocal music group
 Tolkien Black, a recurring character on the animated television series South Park, formerly known as Token Black
 Token (rapper), a hip hop emcee from Massachusetts

Computing
 Token, an object (in software or in hardware) which represents the right to perform some operation:
Session token, a unique identifier of an interaction session
Security token or hardware token, authentication token or cryptographic token, a physical device for computer authentication
 Bearer token, a type of security token in OAuth that gives access to its bearer
Access token, a system object representing the subject of access control operations
Tokenization (data security), the process of substituting a sensitive data element
 Invitation token, in an invitation system
Token Ring, a network technology in which a token circles in a logical ring
 Token, an object used in Petri net theory
 Lexical token, a word or other atomic parse element

Economics
 Token, a voucher or gift card redeemable for items of value
 Token coin, a small, flat, round piece of metal or plastic that can sometimes be used instead of money, e.g.:
 Casino token, also known as a casino chip, check, cheque, or gaming chip
 Knight's token, carried by a medieval knight
 Token money, money that is of limited legal tender
 Tokens, exonumia, items of currency other than coins and paper money

Other uses
 Token (cryptocurrency), certain types of cryptocurrency
 Token (railway signalling), a physical object given to a locomotive driver to authorize him to use a particular stretch of single railway track
 Token Racing, a Formula One car racing team
 Tokenism, the inclusion of a single person (or very few people) of a group so an organization can publicly claim to be inclusive
 Type-token distinction, in logic, linguistics, and computer programming
 Wedding token, Christian wedding paraphernalia also known as an arrhae or wedding coin

See also
 Tokin (disambiguation)